Scola Guadalupana (Scola La Salle) is a De La Salle-supervised private school in Capitol Heights Phase 2, Villamonte, Bacolod, Negros Occidental, Philippines run by the Philippine branch of the De La Salle Sisters of Guadalupe, a sister unit of the De La Salle Brothers.

References

External links
https://web.archive.org/web/20111006064806/http://lasallian.ph/convocation/PLFC2k8-directory.pdf

Schools in Bacolod
Catholic elementary schools in the Philippines
1996 establishments in the Philippines
Educational institutions established in 1996